Cruising by boat is an activity that involves living for extended time on a vessel while traveling from place to place for pleasure.  Cruising generally refers to trips of a few days or more, and can extend to round-the-world voyages.

History

Boats were almost exclusively used for working purposes prior to the nineteenth century. In 1857, the philosopher Henry David Thoreau, with his book Canoeing in Wilderness chronicling his canoe voyaging in the wilderness of Maine, is considered the first to convey the enjoyment of spiritual and lifestyle aspects of cruising.

The modern conception of cruising for pleasure was first popularised by the Scottish explorer and sportsman John MacGregor. He was introduced to the canoes and kayaks of the Native Americans on a camping trip in 1858, and on his return to the United Kingdom constructed his own 'double-ended' canoe in Lambeth. The boat, nicknamed 'Rob Roy' after a famous relative of his, was built of lapstrake oak planking, decked in cedar covered with rubberized canvas with an open cockpit in the center. He cruised around the waterways of Britain, Europe and the Middle East and wrote a popular book about his experiences, A Thousand Miles in the Rob Roy Canoe.

In 1866, Macgregor was a moving force behind the establishment of the Royal Canoe Club, the first club in the world to promote pleasure cruising. The first recorded regatta was held on April 27, 1867, and it received Royal patronage in 1873. The latter part of the century saw cruising for leisure being enthusiastically taken up by the middle class. The author Robert Louis Stevenson wrote An Inland Voyage in 1877 as a travelogue on his canoeing trip through France and Belgium. Stevenson and his companion, Sir Walter Grindlay Simpson travelled in two 'Rob Roys' along the Oise River and witnessed the Romantic beauty of rural Europe.

The Canadian-American Joshua Slocum was one of the first people to carry out a long-distance sailing voyage for pleasure, circumnavigating the world between 1895 and 1898. Despite opinion that such a voyage was impossible, Slocum rebuilt a derelict  sloop Spray and sailed her single-handed around the world.  His book Sailing Alone Around the World was a classic adventure, and inspired many others to take to the seas.

Other cruising authors have provided both inspiration and instruction to prospective cruisers.  Key among these during the post World War II period are Electa and Irving Johnson, Miles and Beryl Smeeton, Bernard Moitessier, Peter Pye, and Eric and Susan Hiscock. During the 1970s - 1990s Robin Lee Graham, Lin and Larry Pardey, Annie Hill, Herb Payson, Linda and Steve Dashew, Margaret and Hal Roth, and Beth Leonard & Evans Starzinger have provided inspiration for people to set off voyaging.

The development of ocean crossing rallies, most notably the ARC (Atlantic Rally for Cruisers), have encouraged less experienced sailors to undertake ocean crossings.  These rallies provide a group of sailors crossing the same ocean at the same time with safety inspections, weather information and social functions.

Types of boats used

Cruising is done on both sail and power boats, monohulls and multihulls although sail predominates over longer distances, as ocean-going power boats are considerably more expensive to purchase and operate. The size of the typical cruising boat has increased over the years and is currently in the range of 10 to 15 metres (33 to 50 feet) although smaller boats have been used in around-the-world trips, but are generally not recommended given the dangers involved. Many cruisers are "long term" and travel for many years, the most adventurous among them circle the globe over a period of three to ten years. Many others take a year or two off from work and school for shorter trips and the chance to experience the cruising lifestyle.

Blue-water cruising and coastal cruising 
Blue-water cruising which is defined as long term open sea cruising is more involved and inherently more dangerous than coastal cruising. 
Before embarking on an open-ocean voyage, planning and preparation will include studying charts, weather reports/warnings, almanacs and navigation books of the route to be followed. In addition, supplies need to be stocked (including fresh water and fuel), navigation instruments checked and the ship itself needs to be inspected and the crew needs to be given exact instruction on the jobs are expected to perform (e.g. the watch, which is generally 4 hours on and 4 hours off, navigation, steering, rigging sails, ...). In addition, the crew needs to be well trained at working together and with the ship in question. Finally, the sailor must be mentally prepared for dealing with harsh situations. There have been many well-documented cases where sailors had to be rescued simply because they were not sufficiently prepared (the sailors as well as the ship) or lacked experience for their venture and ran into serious trouble.

Sailing near the coast (coastal cruising) gives a certain amount of safety. When this method is practiced however, if the ship needs to stop (e.g. for repairs), a trip to a customs checkpoint to have passports checked would be required.

Equipment 
Cruisers use a variety of equipment and techniques to make their voyages possible, or simply more comfortable. 
The use of wind vane self-steering was common on long distance cruising yachts but is increasingly being supplemented or replaced by electrical auto-pilots.

Though in the past many cruisers had no means of generating electricity on board and depended on kerosene and dry-cell batteries, today electrical demands are much higher and nearly all cruisers have electrical devices such as lights, communications equipment and refrigeration.  Although most boats can generate power from their inboard engines, an increasing number carry auxiliary generators. Carrying sufficient fuel to power engine and generator over a long voyage can be a problem, so many cruising boats are equipped with other ancillary generating devices such as solar panels, wind turbines and towed turbines. Cruisers choosing to spend extended time in very remote locations with minimal access to marinas can opt to equip their vessels with watermakers (reverse-osmosis seawater desalination units) used to convert sea water to potable fresh water.

Satellite communications are becoming more common on cruising boats.  Many boats are now equipped with satellite telephone systems; however, these systems can be expensive to use, and may operate only in certain areas. Many cruisers still use short wave maritime SSB and amateur radio, which has no running costs. These radios provide two-way voice communications, can receive weather fax graphics or GRIB files via a laptop computer, and with a compatible modem (e.g. PACTOR) can send and receive email at very slow speed. Such emails are usually limited to basic communication using plain text, without HTML formatting or attachments.

Awareness of impending weather conditions is particularly important to cruising sailors who are often far from safe harbours and need to steer clear of dangerous weather conditions.  Most cruising boats are equipped with a barometer or a weather station that records barometric pressure as well as temperature and provides rudimentary forecasting.  For more sophisticated weather forecasting, cruisers rely on their ability to receive forecasts by radio, phone or satellite.

In order to avoid collisions with other vessels, cruisers rely on a maintaining a regular watch schedule. At night, color-coded running lights help determine the position and orientation of vessels. Radar and AIS systems are often employed to detect vessels positions and movement in all conditions (day, night, rain and fog).

Cruisers navigate using paper charts and radar.  Modern yachts are often also equipped with a chartplotter which enables the use of electronic charts and is linked to GPS satellites that provide position reports.  Some chartplotters have the ability to interface charts and radar images.  Those that still wish to work with traditional charts as well as with GPS may do so using a Yeoman Plotter. Certain advanced sailing vessels have a completely automated sailing system which includes a plotter, as well as course correcting through a link with the ship's steering organs (e.g. sails, propeller). One such device can be found at the Maltese Falcon.

Expense
Purchasing and maintaining a yacht can be costly. Most cruising sailors do not own a house and consider their boat their home during the duration of their cruise. Many cruisers find they spend, on average, 4% of their boat's purchase price annually on boat maintenance.

Like living a conventional life on land, the cost of cruising is variable. How much a person ends up spending depends largely on their spending habits (for example, eating out a lot and frequenting marinas vs. preparing local foods aboard and anchoring out) and the type of boat (fancy modern production boats are very expensive to purchase and maintain, while low-key cruising boats often involve much lower expenses). Most long-term cruisers prefer to live a simple life, usually with far lower expenses than people who live ashore.

An alternative solution is to sail on someone else's yacht. Those who know how to sail can sometimes find boats looking for an extra crewmember for a long trip, while some non-sailors are also able to find boats willing to carry a hitch-hiker. Crew-finding websites exist to help match-up people looking for a crossing with yachts with a berth available or looking for a temporary crewmember, Find a Crew for example. Another common tactic for finding a yacht is to visit local yacht clubs and marinas and get to know the sailors there, in the hope that one of them will be able to provide a berth.

Safety 
Travel by water brings hazards: collision, weather, and equipment failure can lead to dangerous situations such as a sinking or severely disabled and dangerous vessel.  For this reason many long distance cruising yachts carry with them emergency equipment such as SARTs, EPIRBs and liferafts or proactive lifeboats. Medical emergencies are also of concern, as a medical emergency can occur on a long passage when the closest port is over a week away.  For this reason before going cruising many people go through first aid training and carry medical kits. In some parts of the world (e.g., near the Horn of Africa) piracy can be a problem.

Other kinds of maritime cruising 
A booze cruise is a pleasure outing on a ship or boat involving a significant amount of drinking. It may have originated during Prohibition, when Americans would take "cruises to nowhere" to enjoy alcohol, which could legally be served on board once outside American territorial waters.
Camp cruising, also known as beach cruising or gunkhole cruising, is a form of cruising in which sailors sail from point to point in an open or semi-enclosed boat, generally remaining within sight of land.  Camp cruisers either camp ashore ("camp cruising" or "beach cruising"), or aboard the boat at anchor.  The boats used may be specialized cruising dinghies, small keelboats, trailer sailers or general purpose daysailing or racing boats pressed into service for the purpose.
 Commute cruising, also known as seasonal cruising, is becoming increasingly popular.  Commute cruisers live aboard and sail for a few months at a time, exploring new or favorite areas, then leave the vessel in a new location or maybe return it to the same location, travel home for a few months, and return to the vessel to continue cruising during favorable seasons.  This type of cruising is somewhat akin to owning a second home that travels by sea and allows for a dual lifestyle.
Daysailing is recreational sailing that does not involve racing or cruising.   Many racers refer to all non-racers as "cruisers", including dinghy and small keelboat sailors who primarily focus on daysailing.
 LGBT sailing cruising is a type of specialized recreational boat cruising tour organized by cruising operators in many regions of the world. Trips are organized for the LGBT community to provide a unique experience within a "safe space" where travelers can explore new places.
Expedition cruising, where the trips can be a combination of scientists working and tourists along for the adventure, or where scientists lead a group of tourists in order for the tourists to observe animals, plants or natural phenomena.
Travel on cruise ships may be referred to as cruising. Those who take frequent cruise ship vacations may be called cruisers.

See also 

 Boat building
 Cabin Cruiser
 Electric boat
 Gunkholing
 Maritime mobile amateur radio
 River cruise
 Sailboat
 The Cruising Association

References

Further reading 

 Alan Villiers, Cruise of the Conrad. Scribner's, 1937. Reprinted, Seafarer Books, 2006.
 Beth A. Leonard, The Voyager's Handbook
 Don Casey, Dragged Aboard: a Cruising Guide for the Reluctant Mate
 Elbert Maloney, Dutton's Navigation and Piloting - a classic, professional reference, continuously updated.
 Follow the Horizon Cruising Blog
 - just the facts, a classic.

 Jeff & Raine Williams Around the World in Eighty Megabytes
 Lawrence and Lin Pardey, The Self-Sufficient Sailor -
 Lin and Larry Pardey, "Storm Tactics Handbook."
 Lin Pardey, 'Care and Feeding of Sailing Crew'
 Linda and Steve Dashew, Mariner's Weather Handbook
 Linda and Steve Dashew, Offshore Cruisers' Encyclopedia
 Merle Turner, Celestial Navigation for the Cruising Navigator - some theory.
 Michael Carr, "Weather Prediction Simplified"
 Robin Lee Graham, Dove - The story of a 16-year-old boy who sails around the world in a  sloop in the nineteen-sixties
 William F. Buckley Jr., Atlantic High - an account of an Atlantic passage.
 William F. Buckley, Jr., Racing Through Paradise - etc. about a Pacific passage.

External links

 

 
Sailing
Types of travel